HMS Tobago was a schooner of unknown origin that the British Royal Navy purchased in 1805. In 1806 a French privateer captured her. The Royal Navy recaptured her in 1809 and took her into service as HMS Vengeur before selling her later that year.

Career
Lieutenant Donald Campbell was appointed 20 February 1805 to command the schooner that the Royal Navy had purchased and named Tobago. Campbell left Tobago in July.

Lieutenant John Salomon (acting) assumed command of Tobago towards the close of 1805. He had commanded the prison ship Amboyna. Tobago then spent some months sailing between Grenada, Barbados, and Guadeloupe exchanging prisoners of war.

Capture
Before dawn on 18 October 1806 Tobago left Dominica where she had been replenishing her water supplies. Soon after, Salmon sighted a brig, joined by a schooner and a sloop, that all made towards Tobago. Tobago prepared for action, while attempting to steer away from the probably hostile squadron. The enemy closed by 8:30, with the schooner and sloop exchanging fire with Tobago. The French attempted to board, but Tobago repulsed the attempt. She was not able to escape though, and the French schooner was able to get her jib-boom over Tobagos taffrail and rake her with small arms fire. Salmon received a shot in the head and his men took him below decks. Sub-Lieutenant Nichols Gould assumed command and continued the fight for another half-hour but then, with Tobago having lost one man killed and 15 wounded (including Salmon), was forced to strike. Her captor was the French privateer General Ernouf, of 16 guns. Général Ernouf (1805 - 1808), was a Danish 16-gun brig, originally under the command of the notable French privateer captain Alexis Grassin.  sold for 15,300 francs at Guadeloupe.

On 24 June 1807 Salmon received promotion to the rank of Lieutenant after his release and repatriation.

Recapture
On 24 January 1809  was in the English Channel when she captured Vengeur, of 16 guns and 48 men. Vengeur was in company with Grand Napoleon, which escaped. Vengeur herself did not surrender until Beagle came alongside, though her captain, M. Bourgnie, was wounded. Vengeur had made no captures.<ref>Naval Chronicle, Vol. 21, p.164.</ref> Vengeur was the former Tobago.

Disposal
The Royal Navy took Vengeur into service as HMS Vengeur'', but sold her within the year.

Notes

Citations

References
 
 
 
 
 
 
 

1800s ships
Schooners of the Royal Navy
Captured ships
Privateer ships